Minuscule 810 (in the Gregory-Aland numbering), is a Greek minuscule manuscript of the New Testament written on parchment. Palaeographically it has been assigned to the 11th century. The manuscript has been lost.

Description 
The codex contains the text of the four Gospels, on 104 parchment leaves (size ).

Text 
Kurt Aland the Greek text of the codex did not place in any Category.

It was not examined according to the Claremont Profile Method.

History 
According to Gregory the manuscript was written in the 11th century.

It was added to the list of New Testament manuscripts by Gregory (810e).

According to Gregory it belonged to one woman who lived in Athens on the street Οικονομου 6. The actual owner of the manuscript is unknown and the place of its housing is unknown.

See also 

 List of New Testament minuscules
 Biblical manuscript
 Textual criticism
 Minuscule 809

References 

Greek New Testament minuscules
11th-century biblical manuscripts
Lost biblical manuscripts